Augustine Chidi Kwem (born 2 August 1997) is a Nigerian footballer who plays as a forward for South African Premier Division club AmaZulu.

Career
Chidi Kwem was born in Nigeria and played youth football for Beitar Jerusalem before moving to South Africa in October 2018. He trained with University of Johannesburg, and had spells with Polokwane City Rovers, Mthatha Bucks and Sibanye before joining Chippa United on a one-year contract in July 2019. He signed a three-year contract extension in October 2020.

In May 2021, Chidi Kwem signed for TS Galaxy for an undisclosed fee on a two-year contract, with the option for a further two years.

References

1997 births
Living people
Nigerian footballers
Association football forwards
Beitar Jerusalem F.C. players
Mthatha Bucks F.C. players
Chippa United F.C. players
TS Galaxy F.C. players
AmaZulu F.C. players
South African Premier Division players
Nigerian expatriate footballers
Nigerian expatriate sportspeople in Israel
Expatriate footballers in Israel
Nigerian expatriate sportspeople in South Africa
Expatriate soccer players in South Africa